Doiras is one of seven parishes (administrative divisions)  in Boal, a municipality within the province and autonomous community of Asturias, in northern Spain. 

Villages
 La Cabana
 Carrugueiro
 Doiras
 La Escrita
 Froseira
 Llanteiróu
 El Mazo
 Muñón
 Piñeira
 Silvón

References

Parishes in Boal